Howard Storm (born December 11, 1931) is an American film director, television director, and actor.

Storm's acting credits include The New Dick Van Dyke Show, Rhoda, and Sanford and Son, among other television series.

In 1975, he began his directing career, directing episodes of Laverne & Shirley, Busting Loose, Joanie Loves Chachi, Mork & Mindy, Taxi, The Redd Foxx Show, Full House, ALF, and Head of the Class, among other series.

In 1985, Storm directed his only feature film, Once Bitten, starring Lauren Hutton and Jim Carrey. In 2010, he made a small guest appearance in the film Valentine's Day.

References

External links
An Interview with Howard Storm, February 2013

1931 births
Living people
Male actors from New York City
American male film actors
American male television actors
American television directors
Television producers from New York City
American television writers
American male television writers
Writers from Manhattan
Film directors from New York City
Screenwriters from New York (state)